Winiary was a village that is now a suburb of Warka, Poland.

One famous resident of the village was Kazimierz Pułaski, who was active during the American Revolutionary War as a general.

Warka